Minuscule 921 (in the Gregory-Aland numbering), α 553 (von Soden), is a 14th-century Greek minuscule manuscript of the New Testament on parchment. The manuscript has survived in complete condition.

Description 

The codex contains the text of the Book of Acts and Pauline epistles, on 334 paper leaves (size ).

The text is written in one column per page, and 20 lines per page.

Text 
Kurt Aland placed the Greek text of the codex in Category V.
It means it is a representative of the Byzantine text-type.

History 

According to C. R. Gregory the manuscript was written in the 15th century. Currently the manuscript is dated by the INTF to the 14th century.

It was described by Montana, who sent a description to Kelly.

The manuscript was added to the list of New Testament manuscripts by Scrivener (209a, 475r) and Gregory (237a, 475r). In 1908 Gregory gave the number 921 to it.

Formerly it was classified as lectionary under the siglum l 595.

It is currently housed in the Biblioteca de El Escorial (C. IV. 9) in Escurial.

See also 

 List of New Testament minuscules
 Biblical manuscript
 Textual criticism

References

Further reading

External links 
 

Greek New Testament minuscules
14th-century biblical manuscripts